Brian Buchanan is an American politician and businessman serving as a member of the Indiana Senate from the 7th district. He assumed office on February 12, 2018.

Early life and education 
Buchanan was born and raised in Evansville, Indiana. He earned a Bachelor of Arts degree in agricultural education from Purdue University.

Career 
Prior to entering politics, Buchanan worked as the executive director of the Indiana Future Farmers of America Foundation. He is also the owner and sales manager of Buchanan Hauling and Rigging. Buchanan assumed office as a member of the Indiana Senate on February 12, 2018. He also serves as ranking member of the Senate Tax and Fiscal Policy Committee.

References 

Living people
Republican Party Indiana state senators
People from Evansville, Indiana
Purdue University alumni
Year of birth missing (living people)